Thelairoleskia is a genus of parasitic flies in the family Tachinidae. There are at least two described species in Thelairoleskia.

Species
These two species belong to the genus Thelairoleskia:
 Thelairoleskia bicolor Townsend, 1926
 Thelairoleskia longicornis (Mesnil, 1953)

References

Further reading

 
 
 
 

Tachinidae
Articles created by Qbugbot